John Valentine Van Sickle (1892–1975) was a professor of economics at Vanderbilt University and Wabash College.  He wrote and co-authored a number of articles on the economy of the American south. He also co-authored a principles of economics textbook with Benjamin Rogge. He was the author of Freedom in Jeopardy.

References

External links

20th-century American economists
Vanderbilt University faculty
Wabash College faculty
1892 births
1975 deaths
20th-century American non-fiction writers